Sentimentalism may refer to:

 Sentimentalism (philosophy), a theory in moral epistemology concerning how one knows moral truths; also known as moral sense theory
 Sentimentalism (literature), a form of literary discourse

See also
 Sentimentality